Glen Earl Baxter (March 19, 1930 – March 30, 1983) was an American mathematician.

Baxter's fields of research include probability theory, combinatorial analysis, statistical mechanics and functional analysis. He is known for the Baxter strong limit theorem. Lately, his 1960 work on the derivation of a specific operator identity that later bore his name, the Rota–Baxter identity, and emanated from some of the fundamental results of the famous probabilist Frank Spitzer in random walk theory has received attention in fields as remote as renormalization theory in perturbative quantum field theory.

In 1983 the Glen E. Baxter Memorial Fund was established by family and friends at Purdue University.

See also 
 Baxter permutation

References

External links

1930 births
1983 deaths
20th-century American mathematicians